The first school for the deaf was established in France during the 18th century, in 1771 by Charles-Michel de l'Épée. L'Épée was the leader in establishing sign language for the deaf and is notable as the "father" of deaf education. He founded the Institut National de Jeunes Sourds de Paris. French Sign Language was developed and heavily influenced by L'Épée working with deaf people who were already using their own home signs and combining those signs with new signs, which, in this time period, became known as L'Épée sign language. This French sign language became a major foundation and influence on all international sign languages, especially on American Sign Language, which still retains much of the historical signs and signing grammatical structure that originated from France. The American School for the Deaf, in West Hartford, Connecticut, was the first school for the deaf established in the United States, in 1817, by Thomas Gallaudet, in collaboration with a deaf teacher, also from France, named Laurent Clerc with support from the well-known Hartford Cogswell family. Alice Cogswell was the very first student to attend this school in 1817.

See also

 Education for the deaf
 List of schools for the deaf
 :Category:Schools for the deaf
 :Category:Deaf universities and colleges

External links
 MBCN School for the Deaf

References